Schechter Regional High School was a small, coeducational, Conservative Jewish High School, located in Teaneck, New Jersey, United States. It was founded in 2003, as an outgrowth of two lower Schechter elementary and middle schools in existence for the past 20 years.  The school was led by Jay Dewey, and Rhonda Rosenheck. It was announced along with Solomon Schechter High School of New York in April 2006 that the new joint Metro Schechter Academy would be formed from the two schools and would be located in New Jersey starting in the fall of 2006. The renamed, merged school had its first and only graduating class in the spring of 2007.

In late August 2007, the school board announced that a long-time major donor had backed out from a pledge because of "personal financial losses," and the school was closed down.

Curriculum 
Schechter Regional High School offered an array of Judaic and secular classes on a daily basis.

References

External links 
 Schechter Regional High School website

2003 establishments in New Jersey
2006 disestablishments in New Jersey
Conservative Jewish day schools
Conservative Judaism in New Jersey
Defunct schools in New Jersey
Educational institutions disestablished in 2006
Educational institutions established in 2003
Jewish day schools in New Jersey
Private high schools in Bergen County, New Jersey
Teaneck, New Jersey